Jiashan Township is a rural township in You County, Zhuzhou City, Hunan Province, People's Republic of China.

Cityscape
The township is divided into 11 villages and 1 community, the following areas: Dacang Community, Denglongqiao Village, Shafeng Village, Longpanzhou Village, Hushalong Village, Zhuxing Village, Wangjin Village, Xiangkoushan Village, Hejiawan Village, Fubei Village, Baoshanhu Village, and Wucang Village (大沧社区、灯龙桥村、沙峰村、龙蟠洲村、湖沙垅村、株形村、网金村、巷口山村、贺家湾村、伏陂村、宝山湖村、武仓村).

References

Historic township-level divisions of You County